Caffa may refer to:
 Caffa, former name of Feodosiya, a town in Crimea
 Melchiorre Cafà or Caffa (1636-1667), 17th century Maltese sculptor

See also
 Caffe (disambiguation)
 Kaffa (disambiguation)